This is the complete list of Asian Games medalists in triathlon from 2006 to 2018.

Events

Men's individual

Women's individual

Mixed relay

References 
2006 Results
2010 Results

Triathlon
medalists

Asian Games